This article is about the sponsorship of British Members of Parliament by mining trade unions.

The article covers MPs sponsored by the National Union of Mineworkers, its predecessor the Miners' Federation of Great Britain, and the local trade unions which preceded it.

A small number of MPs were sponsored by other trade unions related to the mining industry, such as the Cumberland Iron Ore Miners' and Kindred Trades' Association, the North Wales Quarrymen's Union, and the National Association of Colliery Overmen, Deputies and Shotfirers, and are covered in the articles on those unions.  Other miners and people related to the mining industry were elected without being sponsored by a trade union, and are not listed here.

History
John Normansell, leader of the South Yorkshire Miners' Association, presented a paper at the 1869 Trades Union Congress, on "the best means to secure the direct representation of labour in the Commons".  This led to the formation of the Labour Representation League, but miners did not initially join the organisation.

At the 1874 United Kingdom general election, four miners stood for Parliament, with two winning seats, the first working class members of Parliament in the UK.  Alexander Macdonald in Stafford stood as "Secretary of the Miners' Association of Scotland and President of the Miners' National Association", and Thomas Burt in Morpeth stood as a "Radical Labour" candidate.  However, both worked with the Liberal Party in Parliament, and they were the first members of what became known as the Liberal-Labour group.  Their seats were held at the 1880 United Kingdom general election, and from 1884 the Miners' National Union founded local political associations in areas where there were many miners.  The Reform Act 1885 enfranchised many miners in rural areas for the first time, and this allowed six miners to win election.  In 1886, the local political association formed the Labour Electoral Association, and when the Miners' Federation of Great Britain (MFGB) was founded in 1889, its affiliated unions continued to support liberal candidates through the association.

Keir Hardie, of the Ayrshire Miners' Union, first won a seat as an independent at the 1892 United Kingdom general election, and this spurred him to form the Independent Labour Party and, in 1900, the Labour Representation Committee (LRC).  The MFGB initially believed that the committee would not be successful and remained apart, but from 1902 it raised a centralised Labour Political Fund of one shilling per member, to stand working coal miners or officials as Parliamentary candidates, and then to support successful Members of Parliament, as they were otherwise unpaid.  Candidates were free to stand under the label of any political party, or as independents, although in practice affiliations were agreed with the local union.  At the 1906 United Kingdom general election, this led to the election of eleven out of sixteen MFGB candidates.

In 1906, the MFGB narrowly voted against affiliating to the LRC.  By 1908, the LRC had become the Labour Party, and a second vote was held, this time resulting in a clear majority for affiliation.  Some existing MPs were reluctant to transfer, so it was agreed that they would not have to join the Labour Party group in Parliament until the next general election.  This was held in January 1910, and resulted in fifteen mining trade union MPs, approximately a third of the total size of the party.  However, a few mining MPs refused to take the Labour whip, and remained part of the Liberal-Labour group until 1918.

Miners were uniquely well placed to win seats in Parliament; by 1918, they constituted more than 30% of the total electorate of forty constituencies, and unlike many other unions, the MFGB focused on standing members in these seats, where it had the strongest membership.  After 1918, Labour won the majority of seats in the coalfields.  In Yorkshire, Derbyshire and Durham, the county unions increased political levies, to employ political organisers and election agents, and also support more union members in local elections.  While the miners' union MPs suffered in the 1931 United Kingdom general election, alongside the party as a whole, things soon rebounded.  The MFGB remained the largest union in the country until 1937, and also had sponsored the most Labour Party candidates, had the largest number of members affiliated to the Labour Party, and typically had the largest political fund of any union.  This ensured that it remained influential and able to get its members selected in many promising constituencies.

The choice of candidates remained in the hands of the county unions affiliated to the MFGB.  Half of the MFGB's political fund was retained by its affiliates, enabling them to conduct additional political activity, such as campaigning for other Labour candidates.  The South Wales Miners' Federation instead used the funds to sponsor additional candidates, so that by 1931 it stood 10 candidates, despite the MFGB only directly providing enough funding for five.  This election saw the peak of MFGB influence, with half of all the Labour MPs elected being sponsored by the union.

The mining MPs were not compelled to vote in the interests of the union, and were sometimes in conflict with it, but there was generally a close relationship.  The MFGB got the MPs to propose legislation which it favoured, organise access to the government, and to ask questions and obtain information from government ministers.

The MFGB reformed as the more centralised National Union of Mineworkers (NUM) in 1945, the affiliated unions becoming areas of the NUM.  The number of coal miners, and with it the membership of the NUM, steadily declined, and with it the number of safe mining constituencies, and the number of sponsored candidates, which reached a low of 13 in 1987.  While the selection of candidates remained a matter for the areas, they were required to be members of the NUM, and have worked in the mines or for the union for at least five years.  By the 1970s, the union was tending to select younger candidates.  However, unlike many other unions, it did not sponsor existing MPs from outside the industry, and as a result, by the late 1980s, none of its MPs held leading roles in the Labour Party.

Lib-Lab candidates

1874 general election

Macdonald was elected by taking second place in a two-seat constituency.

1880 general election

Macdonald was elected by taking second place in a two-seat constituency

1885 general election

Abraham stood as an independent Liberal-Labour candidate.

1886 general election

By-elections, 1886–1892

1892 general election

1895 general election

1900 general election

By-elections, 1900–1906

1906 general election

By-elections, 1906–1910

January 1910 general election

December 1910 general election

By-elections, 1910–1918

Other parties

Scottish Workers' Representation Committee

By-elections, 1900–1906

1906 UK general election

Labour candidates

1906 general election

By-elections, 1906–1910

January 1910 general election

By-elections, Jan–Dec 1910

December 1910 general election

By-elections, 1910–1918

1918 general election

By-elections, 1918–1922

1922 general election

By-elections, 1922–1923

1923 general election

1924 general election

By-elections, 1924–1929

1929 general election

By-elections, 1929–1931

1931 general election

By-elections, 1931–1935

1935 general election

By-elections, 1935–1945

1945 general election

By-elections, 1945–1950

1950 general election

1951 general election

By-elections, 1951–1955

1955 general election

By-elections, 1955–1959

1959 general election

By-elections, 1959–1964

1964 general election

By-elections, 1964–1966

1966 general election

By-elections, 1966–1970

1970 general election

By-elections, 1970–1974

February 1974 general election

October 1974 general election

1979 general election

1983 general election

1987 general election

1992 general election

References

National Union of Mineworkers (Great Britain)
British MPs sponsored by trade unions